Jérôme de Mayer (21 July 1875 – 18 August 1958) was a Belgian archer who competed in the 1920 Summer Olympics. He won two gold and one silver medal as a member of the Belgian team in three different team events.

He was father-in-law of World Archery president Oscar Kessels.

References

1875 births
1958 deaths
Belgian male archers
Archers at the 1920 Summer Olympics
Olympic archers of Belgium
Olympic gold medalists for Belgium
Olympic silver medalists for Belgium
Olympic medalists in archery
Medalists at the 1920 Summer Olympics